Protectorate of Morocco may refer to:

 The French Protectorate of Morocco (1912–1956)
The Spanish Protectorate of Morocco (1913–1956)